Houston First Corporation is a local government corporation that operates performing arts and convention facilities in Houston, the largest city in U.S. state of Texas. These venues include the George R. Brown Convention Center, Wortham Theater Center, Jones Hall for the Performing Arts, and the Miller Outdoor Theatre. Houston First also owns the city's largest hotel, the 1,200-room Hilton Americas-Houston.

Houston First represents the consolidation of the former City of Houston Convention & Entertainment Facilities Department and the Houston Convention Center Hotel Corporation. Houston First was established by Houston City Council on June 1, 2011, and went into effect on July 1, 2011.

History 
After Houston City Council approved the creation of Houston First, Mayor Annise D. Parker said the consolidation was undertaken to create operational efficiencies and to take advantage of “business practices that will make it easier to maintain and improve the GRB and ensure it stays in cutting-edge condition.”

In January 2012, Houston First unveiled a new 2025 master plan for the convention center that called for expansion to the north and south of the building along with at least one additional convention center hotel. Houston First entered into an agreement with RIDA Development Corporation to develop a 1,000-room Marriott Marquis near the north end of the convention center.

In June 2014, Houston First and the Greater Houston Convention and Visitors Bureau officially joined forces as a single, clear voice for the City of Houston. The alignment was designed to create a central, one-stop organization for promoting Houston as a prime convention and tourism destination. The unified entity now operates out of Partnership Tower, which opened on September 12, 2016, adjacent to the George R. Brown Convention Center.

Construction was completed and the hotel opened on December 26, 2016, just in time for Houston to host Super Bowl LI in February 2017. The master 2025 plan also called for the boulevard in front of the George R. Brown Convention Center to be converted into a pedestrian plaza. The new Avenida Plaza opened on December 16, 2016.

Assets and Responsibilities 
In addition to the downtown convention center and the 1,200-room Hilton Americas, properties falling under the auspices of Houston First include Wortham Theater Center, Jones Hall for the Performing Arts, Jones Plaza, Miller Outdoor Theatre, Theater District Parking, Sesquicentennial Park, Root Memorial Square, Talento Bilingue de Houston and several other smaller park and performing arts facilities.

Governance 
David Mincberg chairs Houston First's Board of Directors. He was appointed by Houston Mayor Sylvester Turner to succeed Ric Campo in July 2016. Mincberg is CEO of Houston-based Flagship Properties Corporation. Brenda Bazan is president and chief executive officer of the organization.

Board Members 
(Houston's mayor appoints and City Council confirms Houston First's board members.)

 David Mincberg, chairman, Flagship Properties Corporation
 Sofia Adrogué, Diamond & McCarthy LLP
 Alex Brennan-Martin, Brennan's of Houston
 Elizabeth Gonzales Brock, CenterPoint Energy
 Nicki Keenan, Landry's, Inc.
 Desrye M. Morgan, Wells Fargo Securities
 Reginald L. Martin Jr., Executive Chef
 Ryan Martin, LDR Investment Group
 Paul Puente, Houston Gulf Coast Building and Construction Trades Council
 Tom Segesta, General Manager, Four Seasons Hotel - Houston
 Bobby Singh, Isani Consultants
 Gerald Womack, Womack Development and Investment
 Jay Zeidman, Altitude Ventures

City Council Advisory Members (Non-Voting) 

 Dave Martin, District E
 David W. Robinson, At-Large Position 2

Senior Staff 

 Brenda Bazan, president & CEO
 Frank Wilson, chief financial officer
 Paul Casso, vice president of event service
 Holly Clapham-Rosenow, chief marketing officer
 Rick Ferguson, senior vice president - film
 Jorge Franz, senior vice president - tourism
 Julie Gorte, senior adviser, tourism development
 Lisa Hargrove, general counsel
 Robert Jackson, senior vice president - public policy
 Peter McStravick, chief development officer
 Roksan Okan-Vick, senior vice president - regional product development
 John Solis, senior vice president - sales
 Luther Villagomez, chief operating officer - convention center
 Pamela Walko, senior executive assistant

References

External links 
 Houston First Corporation
 Greater Houston Convention & Visitors Bureau
 George R. Brown Convention Center
 Hilton Americas-Houston
 Wortham Theater Center
 Jones Hall for the Performing Arts
 Miller Outdoor Theatre
 Theater District Parking
 Theater District Parks and Plazas

Local government in Texas
Government of Houston
Organizations based in Houston